Sari Falah (born 22 November 1991) is an Druze-Israeli professional association football player who plays as a center back for Bnei Sakhnin.

Early life
Falah was born in the Druze-Arab village of Kisra-Sumei, Israel.

Club career 
Falah made his professional debut, coming on as a substitute for Vladimir Dvalishvili, in a 0–0 Toto Cup draw against Hapoel Be'er Sheva on 11 November 2009.

In 2011–12 season, following the injury of Andriy Pylyavskyi, Falah grabbed first place in the first team and has become an important part in the formation of the Maccabi Haifa coach Elisha Levy, but later lost his place in the composition to Edin Cocalić that was brought in January. At the end of the season, Falah was determined to leave Maccabi Haifa, while still under contract with her. Is absent from the opening training and in summer 2012 under the advice of agent Dudu Dahan Falah signed a contract with Romanian team, though Haifa did not release it. Maccabi Haifa also announced channel to handle disciplinary problems and in the legal and submit complaint to FIFA Falah was loaned eventually to Bnei Yehuda.

In January 2013, in the game against Beitar Jerusalem in Teddy Stadium, Falah broke his ankle, Following injury Falah been away from the field for a long period.

International career 
Falah represented Israel at the 2009 Maccabiah Games, winning a bronze medal.

Falah was part of the Israel national under-21 football team, but following his injury he missed the 2013 UEFA European Under-21 Football Championship.

Club career statistics
(correct as of 1 August 2014)

References

Footnotes 

1991 births
Living people
Competitors at the 2009 Maccabiah Games
Israeli footballers
Association football defenders
Maccabi Haifa F.C. players
Bnei Yehuda Tel Aviv F.C. players
Hapoel Tel Aviv F.C. players
Bnei Sakhnin F.C. players
Maccabiah Games medalists in football
Footballers from Northern District (Israel)
Israeli Druze
Arab-Israeli footballers
Arab citizens of Israel
Druze sportspeople
Maccabiah Games bronze medalists for Israel